Honeydew is a studio album by American rock singer-songwriter Shawn Mullins. It was released in 2008 on Vanguard Records.

Track listing
"All in My Head"
"Home"
"The Ballad of Kathryn Johnston"
"Homeless Joe"
"Leaving All Your Troubles Behind"
"Fraction of a Man"
"See That Train"
"For America"
"Cabbagetown"
"Nameless Faces"
"Song of the Self (Chapter 2)"
"Rewind the Years"

References

2008 albums
Shawn Mullins albums
Vanguard Records albums